Building at 134–136 1/2 Biltmore Avenue is a historic residential building located at Asheville, Buncombe County, North Carolina. It is one of a row of granite apartment buildings on the lower end of Biltmore Avenue. It was built in 1905, and is a two-story, uncoursed rubble granite apartment building with a coursed, rock-faced granite front facade in an English Italianate Revival style.  It features a low, hipped roof with three, tall brick chimneys.

It was listed on the National Register of Historic Places in 1979.

References

Residential buildings on the National Register of Historic Places in North Carolina
Italianate architecture in North Carolina
Residential buildings completed in 1905
Buildings and structures in Asheville, North Carolina
National Register of Historic Places in Buncombe County, North Carolina
1905 establishments in North Carolina